= Marzeah Papyrus =

Archaeological forgery

The Marzeah Papyrus is an inscribed strip of papyrus that is claimed to be the oldest known Hebrew manuscript in the world, allegedly from the 7th century BCE. The document appeared in the antiquities market in 1990. As of 2018, the Marzeah Papyrus is generally thought of as a forgery.
